The Men's Boxing Tournament at the 2003 Pan American Games was held in the Carlos Teo Cruz Boxing Coliseum in Santo Domingo, Dominican Republic from August 8 to August 15.

It served as a qualification tournament for the 2004 Summer Olympics in Athens, Greece.

Medal winners

Medal table

Qualified for the 2004 Summer Olympics

Light flyweight (–48 kg)

Flyweight (–51 kg)

Bantamweight (–54 kg)

Featherweight (–57 kg)

Lightweight (–60 kg)

Light welterweight (–64 kg)

Welterweight (–69 kg)

Middleweight (–75 kg)

Light heavyweight (–81 kg)

Heavyweight (–91 kg)

Super heavyweight (+91 kg)

Notes

See also
Boxing at the 2002 Central American and Caribbean Games
1st AIBA American 2004 Olympic Qualifying Tournament
2nd AIBA American 2004 Olympic Qualifying Tournament
Boxing at the 2004 Summer Olympics

External links
Results
EABA Boxing

P
Boxing at the Pan American Games
Events at the 2003 Pan American Games